Cea (rarely Ceia) is a municipality located in the province of León, Castile and León, Spain. According to the 2010 census (INE), the municipality has a population of 530 inhabitants.

Villages
 Bustillo de Cea
 Saelices del Río
 San Pedro de Valderaduey

See also
Tierra de Campos

References

External links

La provincia de León y sus comarcas; Cea-Campos 

Municipalities in the Province of León